Pizza Showtime was a family restaurant and entertainment centre operating in Perth, Western Australia from 1980 to 1984. Similar to the American Chuck E. Cheese chain it was a sit down pizza restaurant complemented by arcade games, and animatronic characters.

The restaurant was located in the now demolished Grand Theatre building located at 148 Murray Street (a site now occupied by Grand Theatre Lane, showcasing a small cafe, and multiple storefronts). It featured 'space invaders' style game consoles built into the customer tables (operated with tokens) and an animatronic stage show featuring a dog named 'Bert Newhound', a piano playing kangaroo known as 'Melton Pom' (next to joey), singing koalas with 'Lottie' being the lead, a wise cracking horse by the name of 'Ned Kelly' a dingo named 'Ringo Dingo', and a fiddle playing American bear who went unnamed. The animatronic robots cost "in excess of $100,000" and are claimed to have had "more movements than any Disney character". Australian actor Jack Thompson provided the voice for the "Ringo Dingo" character.

Pizza Showtime closed down around 1984 and the robot characters were dismantled and sent to Sydney. The restaurant was originally intended as a starter for a chain of 'Pizza Theatres' around Australia, owned and operated by Allied & Leisure Industries, along with Paul Gregory under the supervision of A&L founder Malcolm Steinberg, who is the current owner of the Timezone arcade game franchise. The building was subsequently converted to an Asian foodhall and was demolished in 1990.

See also

 List of pizzerias in Australia
 List of restaurant chains in Australia

References

Animatronic attractions
Defunct restaurants in Australia
Defunct restaurant chains
Pizza chains of Australia
Pizzerias in Australia
Defunct pizzerias
Restaurants disestablished in 1984
Restaurants established in 1980
Restaurants in Perth, Western Australia